The Nea Power Station  is a hydroelectric power station located in Tydal, Sør-Trøndelag, Norway.

See also

References 

Hydroelectric power stations in Norway
Buildings and structures in Trøndelag